A heritage unit or commemorative locomotive is a railroad locomotive painted in an honorary paint scheme; usually the paint scheme of a now-defunct railroad that merged with or was acquired by the locomotive's owner. Many of them are EMD SD70ACes from Union Pacific, Norfolk Southern, and even Canadian Pacific. The Union Pacific Railroad painted six EMD SD70ACes in stylized paint schemes of six of its predecessors between 2005 and 2006. The Norfolk Southern Railway did the same in 2012 with 20 of its locomotives for its 30th Railroad Anniversary. 10 of them are EMD SD70ACes, while the others are GE ES44AC units. For its 40th anniversary in 2011, Amtrak painted four GE P42DCs, a P40DC, and an EMD F40PH converted to an NPCU into its older paint schemes. Several more were painted for its 50th anniversary in 2021. In 2019, the Canadian Pacific Railway painted nine EMD SD70ACU units in a maroon and gray paint scheme with a different font style. In late 2020, the Canadian National Railway revealed five new heritage units after they had been first spotted a month earlier. These included four GE ET44ACs and one EMD SD70M-2. They were painted in honour of the 25th anniversary of CN's initial public offering. As of 2021, all major railroads have official heritage units, except for BNSF Railway and Kansas City Southern.

List of heritage units 
Below is a list of heritage units in active service by various railroads.

See also 

 Heritage Units

Notes

References

Locomotives by type